The Bull may refer to:

Arts and entertainment
 "The Bull", a short story by Saki
 The Young Bull or The Bull, a 1647 painting by Paulus Potter
 An alternative name for the music venue The Bull's Head, Barnes, south-west London 
 "The Bull", a song from the album Slowheart by Kip Moore
 "The Bull", a song from the album Good Blood Headbanguers by Massacration

Film
 The Bull (2019 film), a film by Boris Akopov
 Il toro or The Bull, a film by Carlo Mazzacurati
 The Bull, a character in the 2009 film Where the Wild Things Are

Radio
 The pub in the long-running BBC radio series The Archers
 KOMG, a country music radio station in Willard, Missouri
 KSD (FM), a country music radio station in St. Louis, Missouri
 KZSN, a country music radio station in Hutchinson, Kansas
 WBUL-FM, a country music radio station in Lexington, Kentucky

People 
 Sammy Gravano (born 1945), American mobster and government informant
 Terry Jenkins (born 1963), English professional darts player
 Andy "The Bull" McSharry, Irish farmer known for his disputes with hillwalkers
 "Johnny the Bull", a ring name of American professional wrestler Jon Hugger

Other uses
 Taurus (constellation)
 The Bull, Dorset, a rock out to sea near Durdle Door on the Jurassic Coast, England
 The Bull at Pinehurst Farms, a Jack Nicklaus-designed golf course located in Sheboygan Falls, Wisconsin, USA
 The Bull at Sonning, a pub in Sonning, England
 The Bull, St Paul's Cray, a pub in London, England

See also
Bull (disambiguation)

Lists of people by nickname